Phillip Marufu (born 10 January 1984) is a Zimbabwean football striker who currently plays for Chapungu United F.C. A Zimbabwe international, he played at the 2006 and 2009 COSAFA Cup.

References 

1984 births
Living people
Zimbabwean footballers
Zimbabwe international footballers
Association football forwards
Zimbabwean expatriate footballers
Expatriate footballers in the Democratic Republic of the Congo
Zimbabwean expatriate sportspeople in the Democratic Republic of the Congo
Chapungu United F.C. players
Dynamos F.C. players
Highlanders F.C.
FC Saint-Éloi Lupopo players
Black Rhinos F.C. players